PraeLegal (combination of words PRAE and LEGAL) refers to second period of the Roman era. After praetor lost his power and Rome became a republic, the senate tried to bring on new changes based on ancient-logical laws of Rome and Greece. In a broader sense, PRAE LEGAL is a directorate which will consist of independent law firms with successful and trusty legal skills, knowledge of the local market and industry expertise, having strong connections with political and business circles and capable of providing cross-border co-ordination of multi-jurisdictional matters.

Legal terminology